Koinange Street is a busy street in the city of Nairobi, Kenya.  In colonial times it was named Sadler St. after an early governor, James Hayes Sadler. After Independence it was renamed after Koinange Wa Mbiyu.

It is a major red-light district. Prostitution is, however, illegal in Kenya.

Koinange Street is the street in Nairobi Central Business District with the highest number of banks along one street.

References

Red-light districts in Kenya
Streets in Nairobi